Suan Son Pradiphat Railway Halt is a railway halt located in Nong Kae Subdistrict, Hua Hin District, Prachuap Khiri Khan. Nearby is Thailand's first automatic level crossing, which opened for use on August 7, 2010 by Abhisit Vejjajiva while he was a Prime Minister. An excursion train terminating here, runs from Bangkok every weekend.

Suan Son Pradiphat is being upgraded to a staffed station, which will begin operation when the double tracking of the line section is completed.

Train services 
 Ordinary 251/252 Bang Sue Junction-Prachuap Khiri Khan-Bang Sue Junction
 Ordinary 254/255 Lang Suan-Thon Buri-Lang Suan

References 
 
 

Railway stations in Thailand